Witaszyczki  is a village in the administrative district of Gmina Jarocin, within Jarocin County, Greater Poland Voivodeship, in west-central Poland. It is famous for being the place of birth of Jerzy Witaszczyk, business specialist and main partner of Guidewire Software.

References

Witaszyczki